Louis-Georges Niels (2 May 1919 – 16 February 2000) was a Belgian bobsledder who competed in the late 1940s. He won a silver medal in the four-man event at the 1948 Winter Olympics in St. Moritz and finished tenth in the two-man event at those same games.

References
1948 bobsleigh two-man results
Bobsleigh four-man Olympic medalists for 1924, 1932–56, and since 1964
DatabaseOlympics.com profile

1919 births
2000 deaths
Belgian male bobsledders
Bobsledders at the 1948 Winter Olympics
Olympic medalists in bobsleigh
Medalists at the 1948 Winter Olympics
Olympic silver medalists for Belgium